Andreas Seidel-Morgenstern (born August 9, 1956 in Mittweida, East Germany) is a German Process Engineer. He is a Director of the Max Planck Institute for Dynamics of Complex Technical Systems in Magdeburg and Chair of Chemical Engineering at Otto-von-Guericke University Magdeburg.

Education & professional career  
Seidel-Morgenstern graduated from Technical University Leuna-Merseburg and received a Ph.D. from the Institute of Physical Chemistry of the Academy of Sciences in Berlin in 1987. After working as a postdoctoral fellow at the University of Tennessee in Knoxville he defended a Habilitation at the Technical University of Berlin in 1994. Subsequently he worked for Schering AG in Berlin, before becoming in 1995 Professor of Chemical Process Engineering at the Otto von Guericke University in Magdeburg. In 2002 he was appointed as a Director at the Max Planck Institute for Dynamics of Complex Technical Systems, where he is head of the “Physical and Chemical Foundations of Process Engineering” group.

Major research interests 
Seidel-Morgenstern's research interests include heterogeneous catalysis, adsorption and preparative chromatography, crystallization and the development of new reactor concepts. The results of his work are published in more than 400 research papers. Specifically, the following topics are being investigated in his department:
New Reactor Concepts
Chromatographic Reactors
Membrane Reactors
Heterogeneous catalysis
Adsorption and Preparative chromatography
Crystallization
Separation of Enantiomers

Awards &  honors (selection)

Publications (selection) 
Journal and Book Contributions, Patents

External links 
 Website at Max Planck Institute for Dynamics of Complex Technical Systems
 Website at Otto-von-Guericke University Magdeburg (in German)

References 

1956 births
Living people
People from Mittweida
People from Bezirk Karl-Marx-Stadt
German chemical engineers
Academic staff of Otto von Guericke University Magdeburg
Engineers from Saxony
Max Planck Institute directors